The China-Japan Agon Cup is a Go competition.

Outline
The China-Japan Agon Cup is a single-game match held each year between the winner of the Agon Kiriyama Cup in Japan and the Ahan Tongshan Cup in China. It is sponsored by Agon Shu. As of 2021, the winner's prize is 5 million yen, and the runner-up's prize is 2 million yen.

Past winners and runners-up

References

International Go competitions